Radical 62 or radical halberd meaning "halberd" or "spear" is one of the 34 Kangxi radicals (214 radicals in total) composed of 4 strokes.

In the Kangxi Dictionary, there are 116 characters (out of 49,030) to be found under this radical.

 is also the 70th indexing component in the Table of Indexing Chinese Character Components predominantly adopted by Simplified Chinese dictionaries published in mainland China.

Evolution

Derived characters

Literature

External links

Unihan Database - U+6208

062
070